I Live on Danger is a 1942 film noir thriller film directed by Sam White and starring Chester Morris and Jean Parker.

Plot
Jeff Morrell is an ambitious radio reporter. The news of the day is the prison release of gambler Eddie Nelson, who was the fallguy for a criminal named Joey Farr.

While exclusively covering a ship's fire, Jeff falls for Susan Richards, and knows her to be Eddie's companion. It turns out she's Eddie's sister, not his girl, and Susan resents it when Jeff's reporting gets Eddie arrested and convicted on a new charge.

District Attorney Lamber is in cahoots with the crooks. Farr tries to flee, and is tracked to a Pennsylvania coal mine. Jeff gets there first and manages to broadcast Farr's confession, then barely gets away when Farr sets off a blast of TNT. Susan loves Jeff for heroically rescuing her brother.

Cast 
Chester Morris as Jeff Morrell
Jean Parker as Susan Richards
Elisabeth Risdon as Mrs. Morrell
Edward Norris as Eddie Nelson
Dick Purcell as Norm Thompson
Roger Pryor as Bert Jannings
Douglas Fowley as Joey Farr
Ralph Sanford as Angie Moss
Edwin Maxwell as Wingy Keefe
Patsy Nash as Dilly
Joe Cunningham as Inspector Conlon
Bernadene Hayes as Jonesy
Billy Nelson as George "Longshot" Harrison
Vickie Lester as Keefe's secretary
William Bakewell as Mac
Charlotte Henry as Nurse
Anna Q. Nilsson as Mrs. Sherman

Production
The film was based on a story called I'll Be Back in a Flash by Alex Gottlieb. He sold it to Pine Thomas Productions in August 1941. They bought it as the second in a three-picture deal Chester Morris had with Pine-Thomas Productions. Lewis Foster was assigned to write the script.

Morris' 38-year-old brother Arthur was meant to play a role in the film but died shortly before filming of a brain haemorrhage.

Jean Parker signed to make the film as the first in a three-picture deal she had with Pine Thomas.

Filming took place in December 1941. Anna Q. Nilsson had her first role in 13 years.

Reception
The Los Angeles Times called it "a pretty good B".

The New York Times said the film showed "very little than what we have already seen."

References

External links 

Review at Variety

1942 films
1940s crime thriller films
American black-and-white films
American crime thriller films
Films about journalists
Films scored by Freddie Rich
Paramount Pictures films
Films directed by Sam White (film producer)
1940s English-language films
1940s American films